Muchmore Valley is a valley 6 nautical miles (11 km) long between Haskell Ridge and Colosseum Ridge in the Darwin Mountains of Antarctica. The valley is filled by ice except at the head, where flow from the Midnight Plateau icecap is insufficient to enter the valley. 

The valley is named after Dr. Harold G. Muchmore of the Oklahoma Medical Research Foundation, Oklahoma City, OK, field leader for a long-term project on biomedical aspects of human adaptation at the South Pole, 1970–83.

References
 

Valleys of Oates Land